Nyuki is a rural locality (a selo) in Kabansky District, Republic of Buryatia, Russia. The population was 249 as of 2010. There are 4 streets.

Geography 
Nyuki is located 5 km southeast of Kabansk (the district's administrative centre) by road. Kabansk is the nearest rural locality.

References 

Rural localities in Kabansky District